This list contains players who have made 25 or more appearances on the Denmark women's national football team. According to the Danish Football Association (DBU) 271 players have appeared for the team since the first official match took place in 1974. The list will note players who placed in any unofficial competitions held before the Danish team was officially recognised by DBU in 1974.

Key

List of players

See also 
 Denmark women's national football team results

Sources

References 

Lists of women's association football players by national team
Denmark women's international footballers
Association football in Denmark lists